Angustmycins are bio-active nucleosides.

External links
 Halo sugar nucleosides. 5. Synthesis of angustmycin A and some base analogues

Nucleosides